Rachele Risaliti (born in Prato on 2 February 1995) is a model and beauty pageant titleholder of the Miss Italia 2016. She won the crown on 10 September 2015.

Biography
Born in Prato (Tuscany), she participated in August 2016 Miss Toscana, winning band. She is a professional dancer in Etruria Team, that won the European Championship of World Gymnaestrada in Helsingborg, Sweden, in 2014. She studied Fashion Project Management at Polimoda.

References

1995 births
Living people
Italian beauty pageant winners
People from Prato